Disha is an Indian feminine given name. Notable people with the name include:
Disha Patani (born 1992/1993), Indian actress
Disha Parmar (born 1992), Indian actress and model
Disha Vakani (born 1978), Indian actress
Disha Ravi (born 1998/1999), Indian climate activist
Disha Pandey, Indian actress and model
Disha Madan, Indian actress and social media personality

See also 

 Disha (film)
 DISHA (spacecraft)